Mink Jazz is a 1963 studio album by Peggy Lee, arranged by Benny Carter and Max Bennett.

Track listing 
 "It's a Big Wide Wonderful World" (John Rox)  – 1:37
 "Whisper Not" (Leonard Feather, Benny Golson)  – 2:17
 "My Silent Love" (Edward Heyman, Dana Suesse)  – 2:33
 "The Lady Is a Tramp" (Lorenz Hart, Richard Rodgers)  – 2:31
 "Days of Wine and Roses" (Henry Mancini, Johnny Mercer)  – 3:08
 "As Long as I Live" (Harold Arlen, Ted Koehler)  – 2:00
 "I Won't Dance" (Dorothy Fields, Oscar Hammerstein II, Otto Harbach, Jerome Kern, Jimmy McHugh)  – 2:03
 "Cloudy Morning" (Marvin Fisher, Joseph McCarthy)  – 2:40
 "I Could Write a Book" (Hart, Rodgers)  – 2:08
 "I Never Had A Chance" (Irving Berlin)  – 2:39
 "Close Your Eyes" (Bernice Petkere)  – 2:18
 "Where Can I Go Without You?" (Peggy Lee, Victor Young)  – 2:46

Musicians
Tracks 1, 4-9, 11, 12
Max Bennett - Leader (arranger) and bass
Justin Gordon - Tenor sax and flute
Jack Sheldon - Trumpet
Bob Corwin - Piano
Stan Levey - Drums
John Pisano - Guitar
Francisco Aguabella - Latin percussion
Tracks 2, 10
Benny Carter - Leader (Arranger)
Justin Gordon - Tenor sax and flute
Max Bennett - Bass
Mel Lewis - Drums
Herb Ellis & Al Hendrickson - Guitars
Lou Levy - Piano
Francisco Pozo - Latin Percussion
Track 3
Same as tracks 2, 10, less Gordon and Pozo, with Harry Klee on tenor sax

Production
Recorded at Studio B, Capitol Records, Hollywood
John Kraus - Recording engineer
John Engstead - Cover photo

References 

1963 albums
Peggy Lee albums
Albums arranged by Benny Carter
Albums produced by Milt Gabler
Capitol Records albums